No Future may refer to:

 "No Future", demo version title, and final version chorus chant from Sex Pistols' "God Save the Queen"
 No Future (novel), a Doctor Who novel, referencing the Sex Pistols song
 No Future (album), a 2020 album by Eden
 No-Future,  a music label, website and online community managed by Cristian Vogel
 "No Future", song by B.o.B. 
 "No Future: Queer Theory and the Death Drive", a non-fiction book by Lee Edelman
 No Future (film), a 2021 film starring Catherine Keener